Mohammad Nouri may refer to:

 Mohammad Nouri (singer), Iranian folk and pop singer
 Mohammad Nouri (footballer), Iranian footballer